Bobrownica is a river of Poland. It is a right tributary of the Skrwa Prawa near Turza Mała.

Rivers of Poland
Rivers of Kuyavian-Pomeranian Voivodeship
Rivers of Masovian Voivodeship